Myriam Miedzian (formerly Miedzianogora) is an American philosopher, author, and social activist. She is the founder of non-profit organizations, including Monumental Women and Prepare Tomorrow's Parents.

Education
Miedzian holds a PhD in philosophy from Columbia University and a master's degree in clinical social work from Hunter College, City University of New York.

Career
Miedzian's career as a philosophy professor included teaching as Rutgers University, Barnard College, and Brooklyn College.

Miedzian and her husband, Gary Ferdman, founded Monumental Women, a non-profit organization dedicated to placing the first statue honoring women in New York City's Central Park. Its efforts were successful and the statue, which honors Sojourner Truth, Susan B. Anthony, and Elizabeth Cady Stanton, was unveiled, after seven years, in August 2020. Miedzian is also a founding director of Prepare Tomorrow's Parents, a non-profit organization that works to promote child-rearing education in public schools.

Miedzian has been a guest speaker on over 300 television and radio programs, and has testified before the U.S. House of Representatives Select Committee on Children, Youth, and Families. She is a writer of articles, op-eds, and blogs. She has delivered lectures on reducing violence through changes in the socialization of boys at international events and academic institutions, including at the International Psychohistory Conferences and the Mississauga/Dufferin-Peel Lecture, in Ontario, Canada.

Selected publications
 Boys Will Be Boys: Breaking the Link Between Masculinity and Violence (Doubleday 1991, Anchor 1992, revised edition Lantern Books 2002) ISBN: 978-0385239325
 Generations: A Century of Women Speak About Their Lives *co-authored with daughter Alisa Malinovich. (Grove Atlantic 1995, Kindle 2013) ISBN 978-0871136787
 He Walked Through Walls: A Twentieth Century Tale of Survival (Lantern Books, 2009) ISBN 978-1590561492

Anthologies
 "Rethinking Peace" (Lynne Rienner, 1994)
 "Ending The Cycle of Violence" (Sage, 1994)
 "Transforming a Rape Culture" (Milkweed, 2004)
 "Violence and Gender" (Prentice Hall, 2004)
 "Motherhood and Feminism" (Seal Press, 2010)
 "New Girl Order: Are Men in Decline?" (Cato Unbound, 2012)
 "Transforming Terror" (University of California, 2011)
 "Marxism, Revolution, and Utopia Vol. 6" (University of California, 2014)

References

Year of birth missing (living people)
American philosophers
American writers
American social activists
Columbia University alumni
Hunter College alumni
Barnard College faculty
Rutgers University faculty
20th-century American women writers
21st-century American women writers
Women founders
Organization founders